Natubhai Thakore  (b 1 June 1960 Vadavi, Ta.-Kadi, Mehsana district, Gujarat )  is a member of Rajya Sabha and a leader of Bharatiya Janata Party. He was elected to Rajya Sabha from Gujarat in 2008.

He is Member of Committee on Petroleum and Natural Gas and Aug. 2012 onwards Member of Committee on Social Justice and Empowerment.

Positions held
 April 2008 Elected to Rajya Sabha 
 May 2008 - May 2009 Member, Committee on Industry
 Aug. 2009 onwards Member, Committee on Industry 
 Aug. 2009 onwards Member, Consultative Committee for the Ministry of Heavy Industries and Public Enterprises 
 May 2012 onwards Member, Committee on Welfare of Other Backward Classes

References 

1960 births
People from Gujarat
Living people
Rajya Sabha members from Gujarat
People from Mehsana district
Bharatiya Janata Party politicians from Gujarat